The Military Provost Staff are the Army's specialists in custody and detention, providing advice inspection and surety within custodial establishments. The MPS form part of the Adjutant General's Corps and are based at the Military Corrective Training Centre (MCTC) in Colchester, Essex.

History
The Military Prison Staff Corps (MPSC) was formed in 1901 under Army Order 241. When initially formed as the MPSC, the corps were based in strategical footholds all over the world. As of 2023 the MPS regiment only retains the following custody facilities:

 The Military Corrective Training Centre (MCTC), Colchester.
 Service Custody Facility (SCF) South, Bulford.
 SCF North, Catterick.
 SCF Scotland, Edinburgh.
 SCF NI, NI.
 SCF Midlands and Wales, Stafford.
 Camp Tapa SCF, Estonia.
 BATUS SCF, Canada. 

In 2022, Conservative MP, Will Quince, signed up to be a reservist in the corps which in turn finished the corps' policy on "only internal transfers". 

All its members hold a minimum rank of corporal.

MPS Regiment 
In December 2015, the Military Provost Staff Regiment was formed as part of 1st Military Police Brigade.  The regiment is currently organised as follows:

 Regimental Headquarters, at Berechurch Hall Camp, Colchester Garrison
 Headquarters Company
 No. 1 Company (Army Reserve)
 SCF Company
 Detention Company

The Commanding Officer of the regiment is a Lieutenant Colonel and also holds the title of Commandant, Military Corrective Training Centre.

References

External links
 Military Provost Staff

British administrative corps
Prison and correctional agencies
Adjutant General's Corps
Military discipline
Military units and formations established in 1901